John Gilmore Marshall (29 May 1917 – 6 January 1998) was an English football player and coach, who played for Burnley, and managed Rochdale, Blackburn Rovers, Sheffield Wednesday and Bury.

He was born in Bolton, Lancashire.

He managed Blackburn Rovers for seven years during which time "Jolly" Jack, a nickname given him by some of the players, led the team (nicknamed "Marshall's Misfits"), to the top of the old First Division (for a day, Boxing Day 1963). This feat that would not be repeated until the investment by Jack Walker in the 1990s.

References

1917 births
1998 deaths
English football managers
Blackburn Rovers F.C. managers
Sheffield Wednesday F.C. managers
Rochdale A.F.C. managers
Bury F.C. managers
Burnley F.C. players
Footballers from Bolton
Association football fullbacks
English footballers